The Ladakhi language is a Tibetic language spoken in the Indian union territory of Ladakh. It is the predominant language in the Buddhist-dominated district of Leh. Though a member of the Tibetic family, Ladakhi is not mutually intelligible with Standard Tibetan.

Ladakhi has several dialects: Lehskat, named after Leh where it is spoken, Shamskat, spoken northwest of Leh, Stotskat, spoken in the Indus valley and which unlike the others is tonal, Nubra, spoken north of Leh, the Changthang language, spoken in the Changtang region by the Changpa people, and the Zangskari language, spoken in the Zanskar region of Ladakh.

Name 

The Ladakhi language is also called Bhoti or Bodhi.
However, since Bhoti and Bodhi sound like “Buddhist” and can alienate Ladakhi Muslims who speak the same language, most Ladakhis usually refer to their language as Ladakhi.

Classification
Nicolas Tournadre considers Ladakhi, Balti, and Purgi to be distinct languages on the basis of mutual intelligibility (Zangskari is not as distinct). As a group they are termed Ladakhi–Balti or Western Archaic Tibetan.

Zangskari is a dialect of Ladakhi spoken in Zanskar and also spoken by Buddhists in the upper reaches of Lahaul (Himachal Pradesh) and Paddar (Paldar).
It has four subdialects, Stod, Zhung, Sham, and Lungna. It is written using the Tibetan script by Buddhists and the Arabic script by Muslim and Christian Ladakhis.

Phonology

Consonants 

  can fricative sounds  as allophones that occur within free variation.
 has an allophone of a retracted velar stop .
 can have allophones  when occurring initially before a voiceless consonant.

Vowels 

Allophones occur in free variation.

Script
Ladakhi is usually written using Tibetan script, and the pronunciation of Ladakhi is much closer to written Classical Tibetan than that of most other Tibetic languages. Ladakhis pronounce many of the prefix, suffix and head letters that are silent in many other Tibetic languages, in particular the Central Tibetan. This tendency is more pronounced to the west of Leh, and on the Pakistani side of the Line of Control, in Baltistan. For example, a Tibetan would pronounce sta ('axe') as [tá], but a Lehpa would say [sta], and a purgi would pronounce [stare]. While a Tibetan would pronounce འབྲས་ ’bras ('rice') as [ɳʈɛ́ʔ], Lehpa say [ɖas], and the purgii pronounce it as [bras].

The question of whether to write colloquial Ladakhi in the Tibetan script or to write an only  slightly Ladakhified version of Classical Tibetan is controversial in Ladakh. Muslim Ladakhis speak Ladakhi but most do not read the Tibetan script and most Buddhist Ladakhis can sound out the Tibetan script but do not understand Classical Tibetan, but some Ladakhi Buddhist scholars insist that Ladakhi must be written only in a form of Classical Tibetan. A limited number of books and magazines have been published in colloquial Ladakhi.

Written Ladakhi is most often romanised using modified Wylie transliteration, with th denoting an aspirated dental t, for example.

Recognition
A section of Ladakhi society has demanded inclusion of a newly named language, Bhoti, to the 8th Schedule of the Indian Constitution. They say that Bhoti is spoken by Ladakhis, Baltis, Tibetans, and throughout the Himalayas from Baltistan to Arunachal Pradesh.

References

External links

A. H. Francke 1901 A Sketch of Ladakhi GrammarJournal of the Royal Asiatic Society of Bengal 70.1 

Bodic languages
Languages of Gilgit-Baltistan
Languages of Ladakh
Culture of Ladakh
Languages written in Tibetan script